is a Japanese master of Shotokan karate.

He started karate at the age of sixteen, during his third year of high school under Sugiura, with only one other student participating. Despite beginning with judo, he found himself too small, but became interested in karate because of its emphasis on speed. Therefore, he trained and developed through the grades, and after graduating from Asia University he was encouraged to join the instructor's programme.

Ueki's karate places a deep emphasis on very strong basics and stances, and he believes to fully appreciate and totally benefit from kata training, one needs to pull the kata apart.

As a young man, he was also very interested in competition, and at the 8th JKA All Japan Karate Championship (1965) he became tournament Grand Champion placing 1st Kata and 2nd Kumite, improving on this three years later at the 11th JKA All Japan Karate Championship (1968) where again he was tournament Grand Champion placing 1st Kumite and 1st Kata.

Ueki was also used in Nakayama's Best Karate series. Of Ueki, M. Nakayama wrote 'the hands and feet of Masaaki Ueki are worth watching, for they are very fast and truly sharp. It is not surprising that many opponents have been defeated'.

Ueki still teaches today, and holding a 10th Dan grade, he is the most senior Instructor of Japan Karate Association.

Major tournament wins
18th JKA All Japan Karate Championship (1975) - 1st Place Kata

17th JKA All Japan Karate Championship (1974) - 1st Place Kata

14th JKA All Japan Karate Championship (1971) - Tournament Grand Champion; 1st Place Kata; 2nd Place Kumite

11th JKA All Japan Karate Championship (1968) - Tournament Grand Champion; 1st Place Kumite; 1st Place Kata

10th JKA All Japan Karate Championship (1967) - 1st Place Kata

9th JKA All Japan Karate Championship (1966) - 2nd Place Kata

8th JKA All Japan Karate Championship (1965) - Tournament Grand Champion; 1st Place Kata; 2nd Place Kumite

References

External links
 JKA Official website

Japanese male karateka
Karate coaches
1939 births
Living people
Shotokan practitioners